Maija Avotins (born 10 April 1975) is a former professional tennis player from Australia.

Biography
Avotins attended the Australian Institute of Sport on a scholarship from Melbourne in the early 1990s. She had a successful career in the juniors, most notably winning the girls' doubles title at the 1992 Wimbledon Championships, partnering Lisa McShea. On the professional circuit she featured as a wildcard in the women's doubles at both the 1993 Australian Open and 1994 Australian Open.

ITF Finals

Doubles finals 8: (1-7)

References

External links
 
 

1975 births
Living people
Australian female tennis players
Wimbledon junior champions
Australian Institute of Sport tennis players
Tennis players from Melbourne
Grand Slam (tennis) champions in girls' doubles
20th-century Australian women